Concern may refer to:

Constructs
Worry, an emotion
Concern (computer science), an abstract concept about program behavior

Enterprises and organizations
Concern (business), a German type of group company
Concern (organisation), a student society at the Indian Institute of Science, India
CONCERN Program, a Con Edison program that offers eligible customers a specially trained representative and advice about government aid programs, safety tips, and ways to save money on one's energy bill
Concern Worldwide, an Irish charity

Other uses
Concern (horse), an American Thoroughbred racehorse

See also
Care (disambiguation)
Concerned, a webcomic parodying the video game Half-Life 2